is a 1986 Japanese film directed by Yoshimitsu Morita.

Awards
8th Yokohama Film Festival
Won: Best Screenplay - Yoshimitsu Morita
Won: Best Actress - Narumi Yasuda
Won: Best Supporting Actor - Kaoru Kobayashi
10th Best Film

References

1986 films
Films directed by Yoshimitsu Morita
1980s Japanese-language films
1980s Japanese films